Janine Wood is an English actress., born on 30 December 1963. She played Clare France in the Thames TV sitcom After Henry, after Gerry Cowper had taken the part in the original radio series. She is mother to William Miller, who played Oliver Twist in the 2007 miniseries adaptation. In 2021, she is set to appear in the ITV crime drama Innocent.

References

External links

1963 births
English television actresses
Actresses from Dorset
Living people